Polyadenum is a genus of proturans in the family Acerentomidae.

Species
 Polyadenum sinensis Yin, 1980

References

Protura